Kuroko's Basketball is an anime series adapted from the manga series of the same name by Tadatoshi Fujimaki. It is produced by Production I.G and directed by Shunsuke Tada, it began broadcasting on Mainichi Broadcasting System on April 7, 2012 with Tokyo MX, Nippon BS Broadcasting, and Animax beginning broadcast in the weeks following. The final episode of season 1 aired on September 22, 2012 and it was announced in the seasonally published Jump NEXT! winter issue that a second season has been green-lit, and aired on October 5, 2013. The series was also simulcast on Crunchyroll as part of their spring lineup of anime titles. The series first DVD and Blu-ray compilation was released on July 27, 2012 with a new DVD/Blu-ray compilation being released monthly. As of December 2012, seven DVD/Blu-ray compilations have been released.

The first season uses four different pieces of theme music; two opening themes and two ending themes. The first opening theme is "Can Do" by GRANRODEO, while the second theme is "RIMFIRE" by the same band.

On October 19 2020, the SAG-AFTRA listed and approved an English dub for the series under the "Netflix Dubbing Agreement". The English-dubbed first season debuted on Netflix on January 15, 2021.


Episode list

References

Kuroko's Basketball episode lists
2012 Japanese television seasons